The 1979 CFL Draft composed of seven rounds where 81 Canadian football players were chosen from eligible Canadian universities and Canadian players playing in the NCAA. A total of 18 players were selected as territorial exemptions, with all nine teams making at least one selection in this stage of the draft.

Territorial exemptions
Toronto Argonauts                            Mike McTague  WR  North Dakota State

Saskatchewan Roughriders                     Al Johns            DT                       Pacific University

Saskatchewan Roughriders                         Tim Hook  G  Montana

British Columbia Lions                       Nick Hebeler  DT  Simon Fraser

British Columbia Lions                           Ron Morehouse  LB  San Diego State

Hamilton Tiger-Cats                          John Priestner  LB  Western Ontario

Hamilton Tiger-Cats  Jim Reid  TB  Wilfrid Laurier

Winnipeg Blue Bombers                        Rick Chernoff  TE  Manitoba

Winnipeg Blue Bombers                            Bill Yaworsky       DE                          Manitoba

Ottawa Rough Riders                          Malcolm Inglis  OT  Carleton

Ottawa Rough Riders                              Pat Stoqua          DB                           Carleton

Calgary Stampeders                           Tom Krebs  G  Utah

Calgary Stampeders                               Doug Battershill  DB  Weber State

Calgary Stampeders                               Rob Forbes  FB  Drake

Montreal Alouettes                           Nick Arakgi  TE  Bishop's

Montreal Alouettes                               Phil Colwell        TB                          Wilfrid Laurier

Edmonton Eskimos                             Marco Cyncar  DB  Alberta

Edmonton Eskimos                                 Kerry O'Connor      TB                          Alberta

1st round
1. Toronto Argonauts  Kevin Powell        OT                         Utah State

2. Saskatchewan Roughriders                      Al Chorney  DB  British Columbia

3. British Columbia Lions                        Mark Houghton  TB  California State

4. Saskatchewan Roughriders                      Gerry Hornett       OT                           Simon Fraser

5. Winnipeg Blue Bombers                         Rick House          TB                            Simon Fraser

6. Ottawa Rough Riders                           Carman Cartieri     LB                            Montana

7. Calgary Stampeders                            Darrell Moir  WR  Calgary

8. Calgary Stampeders                            Daryl Burko  LB  Saskatchewan

9. Edmonton Eskimos  Dan Brown           TE                            Calgary

2nd round
10. Toronto Argonauts                            Dan Huculak         TB                            Simon Fraser

11. Saskatchewan Roughriders                     Bernie Crump        DB                            British Columbia

12. British Columbia Lions  Chris Curran        DB                            Western Ontario

13. Hamilton Tiger-Cats                          Jim O'Keefe         DB                            Wilfrid Laurier

14. Winnipeg Blue Bombers                        Jim Dziedzina       TE                            Simon Fraser

15. Ottawa Rough Riders                          Al Dosant  DB  Windsor

16. Calgary Stampeders  Ed Thomas  DB  Boise State

17. Hamilton Tiger-Cats                          Walt Payerl         WR                           Western Ontario

18. Edmonton Eskimos                             Paul Shugart  TE  Queen's

3rd round
19. Montreal Alouettes                           Ed Szpytma  DE  McMaster

20. British Columbia Lions                       Kevin Aver  DB  St. Francis Xavier

21. British Columbia Lions                       Murray Watson       DE                           Western Ontario

22. Winnipeg Blue Bombers                        Walt Passaglia      WR                           Simon Fraser

23. Winnipeg Blue Bombers                        Doug Biggerstaff    DE                           British Columbia

24. Montreal Alouettes                           Adrian Polesel      T                            McMaster

25. Calgary Stampeders                           Jeff Inglis  OT  Guelph

26. Montreal Alouettes                           Jim Rutka           WR                           Queen's

27. Edmonton Eskimos  Dave Roberts        LB                           Queen's

4th round
28. Toronto Argonauts                            Brent Racette       DE                          British Columbia

29. Saskatchewan Roughriders                     Joe Sturby          LB                          Saskatchewan

30. British Columbia Lions                       Torinado Panetta    LB                          Carleton

31. Winnipeg Blue Bombers  Chris Brewer  DE  Acadia

32. Winnipeg Blue Bombers                        Jim McHugh          LB                          McMaster

33. Ottawa Rough Riders  Dave Green          TB                          Carleton

34. Calgary Stampeders  Clay Richards       DB                          Gavilan College

35. Montreal Alouettes                           Roland Mangold  OG  Northeast Missouri State

36. Edmonton Eskimos                             Blair Shier         T                          Bishop's

5th round
37. Toronto Argonauts                            Mark Forsyth        DB                         Wilfrid Laurier

38. Saskatchewan Roughriders                     Lyle Bauer          OG                         Weber State

39. British Columbia Lions  John Mackay         TB                         British Columbia

40. Hamilton Tiger-Cats                          Mark Heidebrecht    DT                         Springfield College

41. Winnipeg Blue Bombers                        Bob McEachern       LB                         Weber State

42. Ottawa Rough Riders                          Blaine Shore        K                          Queen's

43. Calgary Stampeders                           Dan Hagen  TE  Waterloo-Seneca

44. Montreal Alouettes  Harry Webster       OT                         Bishop's

45. Edmonton Eskimos  Gary Simpson        DB                         Carleton

6th round
46. Toronto Argonauts                            Peter Racey         OT                         Simon Fraser

47. Saskatchewan Roughriders                     Paul Krepinski  DT  Utah State

48. British Columbia Lions                       Berry Muis          WR                         British Columbia

49. Hamilton Tiger-Cats  Jack Davis          DT                         Wilfrid Laurier

50. Winnipeg Blue Bombers                        Gerry Hatherly      LB                         Manitoba

51. Ottawa Rough Riders                          Scott Spurgeon      DB                         St. Francis Xavier

52. Calgary Stampeders                           Ossie Wilson        DB                          McMaster

53. Montreal Alouettes  Richard Payne       LB                          Wilfrid Laurier

54. Edmonton Eskimos                             Bob Colak           LB                          Windsor

7th round
55. Toronto Argonauts                            John Goodrow  TB  Toronto

56. Saskatchewan Roughriders                     Lorne DeGroot       DT                            Alberta

57. British Columbia Lions                       Paul Jaffe          G                             Carleton

58. Hamilton Tiger-Cats                          Peter Hepburn       DT                           Wilfrid Laurier

59. Winnipeg Blue Bombers                        Barry Safinuik      TB                            Manitoba

60. Ottawa Rough Riders                          Dave Behm  TB  Ottawa

61. Calgary Stampeders                           George Fieber       C                             Manitoba

62. Montreal Alouettes                           Keir Cutler  WR  McGill

63. Edmonton Eskimos                             Paul Shugart       TE                             Queen's

References
Canadian Draft

Canadian College Draft
Cfl Draft, 1979